Hip Hop Na, literally meaning "Our Hip Hop" in Arabic, is a hip hop talent-hunting programme that aired on MTV Arabia in 2007. It was hosted by Fredwreck Nassar & Qusai Kheder. The show held auditions in various countries in the Middle East with the grand finale held in Dubai.

References

External links 
 Cox Washington Report
 Hip Hop Report's Report

MTV original programming